is a  private junior college in Kiyosu, Aichi, Japan.

Academic departments 
 Rehabilitation
 Physiotherapy
 Occupational therapy

History
 1982: Vocational school for physiotherapy was set up.
 1994: Academic department for occupational therapy was set up.
 2008: Junior college opened in Kiyosu, Aichi.
 2010: Advanced course for physiotherapy and occupational therapy was set up. Vocational school closed.

See also 
 List of junior colleges in Japan

External links
  

Universities and colleges in Aichi Prefecture
Japanese junior colleges
Private universities and colleges in Japan
Educational institutions established in 2008
Kiyosu, Aichi
2008 establishments in Japan